Ilankai Tamil Arasu Kachchi (ITAK) is a Sri Lankan political party which represents the Sri Lankan Tamil ethnic minority in the country. It was originally founded in 1949 as a breakaway faction of the All Ceylon Tamil Congress (ACTC). In 1972, ITAK merged with the ACTC and Ceylon Workers' Congress (CWC) to form the Tamil United Front, which later changed its name to the Tamil United Liberation Front (TULF). ITAK remained dormant until 2004 when a split in the TULF resulted in ITAK being re-established as an active political party. ITAK is a constituent party of the Tamil National Alliance.

History

Federal Party

ITAK was founded in late 1949 by a group of three Ceylon Tamil parliamentarians, S. J. V. Chelvanayakam, C. Vanniasingam and Senator E. M. V. Naganathan, who had withdrawn from G. G. Ponnambalam's ACTC over the latter's decision to enter the United National Party (UNP) government of D. S. Senanayke. ITAK was commonly called or known as the Federal Party (FP) in English.

Policies adopted by successive Sri Lankan governments, and the 1956 success of the Sinhalese nationalist government under Solomon Bandaranaike, made the FP the main voice of Sri Lankan Tamil politics. Increased racial and political tension between the country's ethnic groups led three political parties representing the ethnic minorities (FP, ACTC and the CWC) to form the Tamil United Front (TUF) in 1972. The TUF became increasingly nationalistic and by 1976 it had renamed itself as the Tamil United Liberation Front and was advocating an independent Tamil state. The CWC subsequently left the TULF.

The TULF became the first Tamil nationalist party to run on a separatist platform in the 1977 election. It gained a majority of the votes in the north and east, won 18 seats, and became the largest opposition party in parliament. As Tamil nationalism turned violent and civil war broke out, the TULF remained the moderate face of Tamil politics. It became the target of nationalists on both sides and many of its leaders were assassinated.

Tamil National Alliance
  
In 2001, the TULF formed a political alliance, the Tamil National Alliance (TNA), with other moderate Tamil parties as well as a number of former militant groups. The TNA contested the 2001 parliamentary election under the TULF name and won 15 seats. Subsequently, the TNA began to make a more pro-Tamil Tiger stance, recognising the Tigers as the sole representative of the Sri Lankan Tamils. This caused a split within the TULF. This meant some members of the TULF, led by its President V. Anandasangaree, were opposed to the Tigers. Anandasangaree refused to allow the TNA to use the TULF's name during the 2004 parliamentary election. This caused the members of TULF who wished to remain with the TNA to resurrect the Illankai Tamil Arasu Kachchi name. ITAK is a registered political party and the TNA has contested all elections since the 2004 parliamentary election under the ITAK name.

Election results

1952 Parliamentary General Election
In the first general election contested by ITAK, the 1952 election in which the UNP increased its stranglehold on power, ITAK won 1.9% of the popular vote and 2 out of 95 seats in the Sri Lankan parliament. The ACTC won four seats.

1956 Parliamentary General Election
In the 1956 election in which the SLFP-led leftist coalition swept to power, ITAK won 5.39% of the popular vote and 10 out of 95 seats in the Sri Lankan parliament. The ACTC won just one seat. ITAK became the dominant party in the Tamil districts and remained so for two decades.

Votes and seats won by ITAK by electoral district

ITAK's uncompromising stand on Tamil rights earned it the enmity of nationalist Sinhalese. In response to the Sinhala Only Act of 1956, ITAK MPs staged a satyagraha protest, but it was violently broke up by a Sinhalese mob. ITAK was blamed for the 1958 riots and banned briefly.

Unlike the Left parties, which opposed anything but full parity for the Tamil language, ITAK agreed to compromise and accepted the 1958 the Tamil Language (Special Provisions) Act in accordance with the Bandaranaike–Chelvanayakam Pact.

1960 (March) Parliamentary General Election
In the March 1960 election in which the UNP became the largest party, ITAK won 5.80% of the popular vote and 15 out of 151 seats in the Sri Lankan parliament.

Votes and seats won by ITAK by electoral district

1960 (July) Parliamentary General Election
In the July 1960 election in which the SLFP became the largest party, ITAK won 7.0% of the popular vote and 16 out of 151 seats in the Sri Lankan parliament.

1965 Parliamentary General Election
In the 1965 election in which the UNP became the largest party, ITAK won 5.38% of the popular vote and 14 out of 151 seats in the Sri Lankan parliament.

Votes and seats won by ITAK by electoral district

1970 Parliamentary General Election
In the 1970 election in which the SLFP-led United Front coalition won a landslide, ITAK won 4.92% of the popular vote and 13 out of 151 seats in the Sri Lankan parliament.

Votes and seats won by ITAK by electoral district

1977 Parliamentary General Election
In the first general election contested by the TULF, the 21 July 1977 election in which the UNP won by a landslide, the TULF won 6.40% of the popular vote and 18 out of 168 seats in the Sri Lankan parliament, including all 14 seats in the Northern Province.

Votes and seats won by TULF by electoral district

The TULF became the official opposition as result of the rout of the SLFP. The TULF's success would lead to riots in which hundreds of Tamils were murdered by Sinhalese mobs.

Throughout the 1970s and early 1980s, the TULF was frequently blamed by nationalist Sinhalese politicians for acts of violence committed by militant groups such as the Liberation Tigers of Tamil Eelam (LTTE). In fact, the TULF represented an older, more conservative generation of Tamils that felt independence could be achieved without violence, more rival than ally to youth groups like the LTTE who believed in armed conflict.

In October 1983, all the TULF legislators, numbering sixteen at the time, forfeited their seats in Parliament for refusing to swear an oath unconditionally renouncing support for a separate state in accordance with the Sixth Amendment to the Constitution of Sri Lanka.

During the 1980s, the LTTE began to see the TULF as a rival in its desire to be considered the sole representatives of the Tamils of the north and east. Over the next two decades, the LTTE assassinated several TULF leaders, including A. Amirthalingam and Neelan Thiruchelvam.

1989 Parliamentary General Election
The TULF formed an alliance with the three Indian backed paramilitary groups, Eelam National Democratic Liberation Front (ENDLF), Eelam People's Revolutionary Liberation Front (EPRLF) and Tamil Eelam Liberation Organization (TELO), to contest the 15 February 1989 election. The alliance won 3.40% of the popular vote and 10 out of 225 seats in the Sri Lankan parliament.

Votes and seats won by TULF / ENDLF / EPRLF / TULF alliance by electoral district

1994 Parliamentary General Election
In the 16 August 1994 election in which the People's Alliance led by Chandrika Kumaratunga came to power after 17 years of UNP rule, the TULF won 1.60% of the popular vote and 5 out of 225 seats in the Sri Lankan parliament.

Votes and seats won by TULF by electoral district

2000 Parliamentary General Election
In the 10 October 2000 election in which the People's Alliance led by Ratnasiri Wickremanayake retained to power, the TULF won 1.23% of the popular vote and 5 out of 225 seats in the Sri Lankan parliament.
Votes and seats won by TULF by electoral district

2001 Parliamentary General Election

2004 Parliamentary General Election

2010 Parliamentary General Election

References

 
Tamil Eelam
Sri Lankan Tamil nationalist parties
Political parties in Sri Lanka
Tamil National Alliance
Political parties established in 1949
1949 establishments in Ceylon